Parti may refer to:
Parti (surname), a Hungarian surname, and a list of people with the name
Parti (architecture), the organizing concepts behind an architect's design

, a lake in Russia

See also

Partie (disambiguation)
Party (disambiguation)
Partial (disambiguation)
Partita (also partie, partia, parthia, or parthie), a single-instrumental piece of music, or dance suite 
Parti-coloured bat